(February 11, 1911 – January 8, 2006) was a Japanese author notable for his book What Really Happened in Nanking: The Refutation of a Common Myth, which denies that the Nanking Massacre as traditionally understood took place. Originally written in Japanese in 1987, an English version was published in 2000 in response to  Iris Chang's book, The Rape of Nanking.

Document Tampering Controversy 
A Japanese World War II veteran, Tanaka served as General Iwane Matsui's secretary at the time of Nanking Massacre in 1937. He was involved in a controversy in 1986 when he was found to have altered a key historical document, in several hundred places when serving as the editor for its publication in 1985. He suffered academic ostracism after the controversy but remained an active author for the non-academic market.

References 

Japanese writers
1911 births
2006 deaths
Nanjing Massacre deniers
Historical negationism